Wilhelm Schröter is a composer and pianist. Schröter was born in Rio de Janeiro, Brazil, January 16, 1960.

Biography
Schröter was born into a family of musicians. His father, Harry, was a violinist and his mother, Maria Helena Didier Moniz de Aragão do Rego Maciel Schröter, was pianist and piano teacher. When he was just nine years old, Wilhelm started to accompany his aunt Maria Schroeter, a soprano, on piano performing pieces by Franz Schubert and Robert Schumann. He wrote his first composition at age 12.

Schröter began his career in 1975 performing piano recitals at age 15 in Brazil. He graduated with a degree in music in 1988. Schröter no longer tours and now concentrates on composing. He mainly composes classical music, but sometimes experiments with other music genres such as jazz with classical elements, pop, voice and movie themes. He also writes music electronically. He has written approximately 300 works.

He is the cousin of Olga Maria Schröter, a soprano, who is also related to composers Johann Samuel Schröter, his sister Corona Schröter, Leonhart Schröte and Christoph Gottlieb Schröter.

Awards
Schröter received his first award at 16 years of age. His first solo performer with orchestra award came at age 25 (Piano Concerto No. 1 (Chopin)). Schröter participated in many piano competitions to boost his career. He has traveled to the U.S. including Seattle, WA during concert tours. Schröter also visited pianist Sebastian Benda.
 Best Interpretation of Villa-Lobos, Brasilia/DF - Brazil - 1976 (16 years old)
 Composition award in Sao Paulo/SP, 1984
 Winner of the orchestra soloist competition - OSPA/Porto Alegre/RS, 1985
 Semifinals in Internacional Piano Competition in Montevideo - Uruguay, 1985
 3o. Prize in Chopin national competition in Curitiba/PR - Brazil, 1986
 Masterworks prize (vol. 12 and 13)- With concerto Op.180 No. 3 and Op.209 No. 4.
 Canzonneta for wind quintet op.163 and Nocturne for piano no.12 Selected by Oregon Literary Review, 2006.
 In 1993–1994 he traveled to Germany Master Class with Ceslaw Kacinsky, Jorg Demus, and Peter Rosel
 In 2000–2001 he traveled to the U.S. to perform in recitals
 In Pop Scenario, Schroeter also is receiving recognition for his work. His song "Heaven on Earth", for example, got some awards and nominations in USA and Europe.

Catalogue

 29 Preludes for Piano op.1
 Sonata for Violin and Piano op.2 no.1
 Infant Suite for Piano op.3 no.1
 Sonatine for Piano op.4
 6 Ideas for Piano op.5
 Suite for Flute and Piano op.6 no.1
 Sonata for Violin and Piano op.7 no.2
 Impromptu for Piano op.8
 Fantasy for Guitar and Piano op.9
 Fantasy for Cello and Piano op.10
 Music for Violin and Piano op.11
 Fantasy for Clarinet and Piano op.12 No.1
 Fantasy for Piano op.13 no.1
 Brasiliana for Piano op.14
 3 Themes for Piano op.15
 Poetic Prelude for Piano op.16 no.1
 Fantasy for Flute and Piano op.17 no.1
 Scherzo for Bassoon and Piano op.18
 Poetic Prelude for Piano op.19 no.2
 Suite Infantil for Piano op.20 no.2
 Prelude and Fuga for Piano op.21
 Fantasy for Violin and Piano op.22
 Fantasy for Piano op.23 no.2
 Sonata for Cello and Piano op.24
 Two part Invention for Piano op.25
 Music for Violin Viola and Piano op.26
 Fantasy for Piano op.27 no.3
 Fantasy for Piano op.28 no.4
 Music for Piano op.29
 Ballade for Piano op.30
 "I Love You" for Singer 2 Fl. and Piano op.31
 Suite for Flute and Piano op.32 no.2
 Fantasy for Flute and Piano op.33 no.2
 Theme and 7 variations for Piano op.34
 Sonata for Viola and Piano op.35
 Etude for Piano op.36 no.1
 Etude for Piano op.37 no.2
 Fantasy for Flute Clarinet Bass.and P.op.38
 Etude for Piano op.39 no.3
 Etude for Piano op.40 no.4
 Nocturne for Piano op.41 no.1
 Nocturne for Piano op.42 no.2
 Nocturne for Piano op.43 no.3
 Nocturne for Piano op.44 no.4
 Nocturne for Piano op.45 no.5
 "Rio" for Singer and Piano op.46
 Nocturne for Piano op.47 no.6
 Sonata for Bassoon and Piano op.48 no.1
 Fantasy for Oboe and Piano op.49
 Sonata for Violin and Piano op.50 no.3
 Sonata for Violin and Piano op.51 no.4
 Nocturne for Piano op.52 no.7 for Piano
 Fantasy for Trio and Piano Op.53
 Conc.for Piano and Orchestra op.54 no.1
 "Mar" for Singer and Piano op.55
 Poetic Prelude for Piano op.56 no.3
 Symphonic Overture for Orchestra op.57
 Symphonic Moment for Orchestra op.58
 "Feeling" for Piano op.59
 Serenade for Violin and Cordas op.60
 3 Poemas for Piano op.61
 4 Fant.em Jazz for Violin and Piano op.62
 5 Fantasies em Jazz for Piano op.63
 "Walk in the Street" for Piano op.64
 "Landscape" for Piano op.65
 "The River" for Piano op.66
 "My Son Playing" for Piano op.67
 "The Cloud" for Piano op.68
 "The Stars" for Piano op.69
 "Mortality of the Insects" for P.op.70
 "Happy Hour" for Piano op.71
 "Sad Waltz" for Piano op.72
 Nocturne for Piano op.73 no.8
 "Mrs. Evie drink the tea" for Piano op.74
 "Mr.Alfred drink the coffee" for Piano op.75
 Nocturne for Piano op.76 no.9
 Serenade for Trump.Sax 2 Tromb.T.and P.op.77
 "The Toy" for Piano op.78
 "Planets" for Flute and Piano op.79
 28 Romantic Themes for Piano op.80
 Nocturne for Piano op.81 no.10
 Nocturne for Piano op.82 no.11
 "...for the sick children" for Piano op.83
 Fantasy for Piano op.84 no.5
 Waltz for Piano for two hands Op.85
 Concerto for Piano and Orchestra op.86 no.2
 Suite for Piano op.87 no.3
 Scherzo for Piano op.88
 Toccata for Piano op.89
 Sonata for Piano op.90 no.2
 Nocturne for Piano op.91 no.12
 Christmas Rhapsody for piano op.92 no.1
 Christmas Rhapsody for piano op.93 no.2
 Etude for piano op.94 no.5
 Canzonetta for 4 Cellos op.95
 Rhapsody (R) for Piano op.96
 Rhapsody (PL) for Piano op.97
 Rhapsody (HB) for Piano op.98
 Hungarian Dance for 2 Pianos op.99
 Polonaise for Piano op.100
 Polonaise for Piano op.101
 Chopin Concerto op.102
 Fantasy in jazz No.1 for Trombone and Piano Op.103
 Fantasy in jazz No.2 for Trombone and Piano Op.104
 Fantasy in jazz No.3 for Trombone and Piano Op.105
 Fantasy in jazz No.4 for Trombone and Piano Op.106
 Etude for Guitar op.107
 Nocturne for Guitar op.108
 Theme for Sibelius op.109 no.1
 Ritwav for G.,Bass, E.P.and Strings op.110 no.1
 Ritwav for Organ and Violin op.111 no.2
 Ritwav for Trumpet Piano Bass and Drums op.112 no.3
 Woman Dancing in the Desert for Orchestra op.113
 Movie Theme for Orchestra op.114 no.29
 God Save the Queen Rhapsody for Piano op.115
 One Kiss in Albeniz for Piano op.116
 One Kiss in Tchaikowsky for Piano op.117
 Movie Theme for Orchestra Op.118 no.01
 Minute Bach for Str, 2 P, Organ and Bass Guitar Op.119
 Movie Theme for Piano and Orchestra Op.120 no.02
 Movie Theme for Orchestra Op.121 no.03
 Movie Theme for Vibraphone and Orchestra Op.122 no.04
 Movie Theme for Wood. P. and Orchestra Op.123 no.05
 Movie Theme for Piano and Orchestra Op.124 no.06
 Movie Theme for Oboe P. Cel.and Orchestra Op.125 no.07
 Ritwav for Bass Trumpet Organ Guitar and Drums Op.126 no.4
 Ritwav for Guitar Bass and Drums Op.127 no.5
 Ritwav for Organ Bass and Drums Op.128 no.6
 Ritwav for 2 Organs Strings, Bass and Drums Op.129 no.7
 Movie Theme for Piano and Orchestra Op.130 no.08
 Ritwav for Trumpets Organ Guitar and Drums Op.131 no.8
 Ritwav for Organ, Bass Guitar and Drums Op.132 no.9
 Ritwav for 2 Trumpet Horn 2 Organs Bass Drums and Strings Op.133 no.10
 Ritwav for 2 Organs Bass and Drums Op.134 no.11
 Ritwav for 2 Organs Bass and Drums Op.135 no.12
 Movie Theme No.9 for Piano and Orchestra Op.136 no.09
 Movie Theme No.10 for Piano and Orchestra Op.137 no.10
 Song for Naira for Singer and Piano Op.138
 Song for Weber No.3 for Piano Op.139
 Sorcere's Apprendice (adaptation) Op.140
 Sonata for Violin and Piano Op.141
 Musica - I Feel Affliction for Violin and Piano Op.142
 Scherzo for Violin and Piano Op.143
 Theme for Sibelius Op.144 no.2
 Movie Theme No.11 for 2 Guitars and Orchestra Op.145
 Etude No.6 "Katrina" for Piano Op.146
 Movie Theme No.12 for Piano and Orchestra Op.147
 Movie Theme No.13 for Bass and Orchestra Op.148
 Movie Theme No.14 for Bass and Orchestra Op.149
 Movie Theme No.15 for Piano and Orchestra Op.150
 Movie Theme No.16 for Piano and Orchestra Op.151
 Movie Theme No.17 for Trumpet and Orchestra Op.152
 Movie Theme No.18 for Piano and Orchestra Op.153
 Movie Theme No.19 for Flute and Orchestra Op.154
 Movie Theme No.20 for Piano Orchestra Op.155
 Movie Theme No.21 for Harmonica Orchestra Op.156
 Movie Theme No.22 for Piano and Orchestra Op.157
 Canzonetta for Flute, Oboe and Cello Op.158
 Canzonetta for 4 Clarinets Op.159
 Fantasy for Clarinet and Piano Op.160 No.2
 Sonata No.1 for Flute and Piano Op.161
 Sonata No.1 for Clarinet (Bb) and Piano Op.162
 Canzonetta for Flute Oboe Clarinet (Bb) Bassoon and French Horn Op.163
 Canzonetta for String Quartet Op.164
 Symphonic Suite No.1 op.165
 Movie Theme No.23 for Piano and Orchestra Op.166
 Movie Theme No.24 for Piano and Orchestra Op.167
 Movie Theme No.25 for Piano and Orchestra Op.168
 Movie Theme No.26 for Flute and Orchestra Op.169
 Happy Moment in C for Vibraphone and Strings Op.170
 Movie theme No.27 for Piano Op.171
 Movie Theme No.28 for Piano and Orchestra Op.172
 Movie Theme No.30 for Vibraphone and Orchestra Op.173
 Movie Theme No.31 for Piano and Orchestra Op.174
 Movie Theme No.32 for Orchestra Op.175
 Movie Theme No.33 for Piano and Orchestra Op.176
 Movie Theme No.34 for Trumpet, Piano and Orchestra Op.177
 Song for Weber No.1 for Piano Op.178
 Movie Theme No.39 for Orchestra Op.179
 Piano Concerto Op.180 No.3 Op.180
 Movie Theme No.35 for Piano Op.181
 Movie Theme No.36 for Piano and Orchestra Op.182
 Movie Theme No.37 for Piano and Orchestra Op.183
 Movie Theme No.38 for Flute and Orchestra Op.184
 Sonata for Clarinet (Bb) and Piano Op.185 No.2
 Sonata for Cello and Piano Op.186 No.2
 Sonata for Viola and Piano Op.187 No.2
 Fantasy for Bassoon and Piano Op.189
 Scherzo for Oboe and Piano Op.190
 Sonata No.1 for Oboe and Piano Op.191
 Fantasy No.2 for Trio (Strings) and Piano Op.192
 Sonata No.3 for Cello and Piano Op.193
 Serenade Classica for Brass Quartet and Strings Op.194
 Musica for Violin Cello and Piano Op.195
 Serenade Classica for Woodinds and Strings Op.196
 Musica for Flute and Clarinet Op.197
 Sonata Basson Op.198 no.02
 Fantasy for Brass and Piano Op.199
 Song for Weber No.2 for Piano Op.200
 Come Back to Me for Voice Piano and orchestra Op.201
 Musica for String Quartet Op.202
 Sonata for Bassoon and Piano Op.203 no.2
 Musica for Trombone and Piano Op.204
 Musica for Contrabass and Piano Op.205
 Sonata for Cello and Piano Op.206 no.4
 Musica for Flute Clarinet and Piano Op.207
 Serenade for Clarinet and Strings Op.208
 Piano Concerto Op.209 No.4
 Waltz for Piano Op.210 no.2
 Nocturne for Piano Op.211 No.13
 Nocturne Op.212 No.14
 Young Composers Theme Op.213
 Nocturne Op.214 No.15
 Concerto Op.215 No.5
 Nocturne Op.216 No.16
 Canzonetta for Wind Quartet Op.217
 Canzonetta for String orchestra Op.218

References

Brazilian jazz pianists
Brazilian classical pianists
Blues pianists
Boogie-woogie pianists
Folk pianists
Free improvisation pianists
Jazz-pop pianists
Música Popular Brasileira pianists
New-age pianists
Pop pianists
Progressive rock pianists
Ragtime pianists
Rhythm and blues pianists
Rock pianists
Smooth jazz pianists
Soft rock pianists
Stride pianists
21st-century classical composers
Brazilian people of German descent
Musicians from Rio de Janeiro (city)
1960 births
Living people
Male classical composers
Male classical pianists
21st-century classical pianists
21st-century male musicians
Male jazz musicians